Tommy Scott Hooper is a Canadian songwriter and musician.

He was a founding member of the Kelowna punk band Gentlemen of Horror, and also of The Grapes of Wrath, one of the most popular Canadian rock bands of the late 1980s and early 1990s. When singer/guitarist Kevin Kane left The Grapes of Wrath in 1992, Hooper and the rest of the band went on to become Ginger. Hooper and Kane later reunited as The Grapes of Wrath in 1998 and released an album called Field Trip in 2000. He is the brother of drummer and Grapes of Wrath bandmate Chris Hooper.

Hooper later released a solo album, The Unexplored Cosmos, in 2002. In 2014, he released the album Basement Suite and in 2015, he released album "Tom's Journey through the solar system". 

He is married to ex-Lava Hay singer songwriter Suzanne Little, with whom he has two children.

Discography

The Grapes of Wrath

Ginger

Solo artist

The Hooper Family

Tom Hooper & The Angry Hippies

References

External links
Now and Again: A Grapes of Wrath Fansite
Tom Hooper's myspace page
Gentleman of Horror website

Canadian rock singers
Canadian songwriters
Canadian male singers
Year of birth missing (living people)
Musicians from Kelowna
Living people
Canadian folk rock musicians